Turn Up the Radio may refer to:

 "Turn Up the Radio" (Autograph song)
 "Turn Up the Radio" (Madonna song)
 "Turn Up the Radio", a song by American rock band Die Trying from the album Die Trying
 "Turn Up the Radio", a song by American indie rock band Jupiter One from the album Jupiter One
 "Turn Up the Radio", a song by contemporary Christian music trio Phillips, Craig and Dean from the album Phillips, Craig & Dean
 "Turn Up the Radio", a song by American rock band The Rockets from the album The Rockets/No Ballads
 "Turn Up the Radio", a song by American rock band OK Go from the album Hungry Ghosts (album)